Clearwell Caves, at Clearwell in the Forest of Dean, Gloucestershire, England, is a natural cave system which has been extensively mined for iron ore. It now operates primarily as a mining museum.

The caves are part of a Natural England designated Site of Special Scientific Interest and the notification includes parts of Clearwell along with Old Bow, Lambsquay and Old Ham mine complexes.

Mining 
Clearwell Caves are a collection of six mines: Clearwell, Old Ham, Lambsquay, Old Bow, Oak Pit and New Dun, covering approximately 250 acres. The interconnected cave systems were formed by underground streams from around 180 million years ago. They have been mined originally for ochre, then for iron ore from Iron Age times Circa 100BC increasing from Roman times and extensively during the 19th century, which considerably enlarged and extended the network of natural caverns.

Ochre has been mined here for even longer.

The nearby scowles at the Secret Forest and Puzzlewood represent shallow surface mines which have been exposed from above and later became entrances to these deeper mines.

Clearwell Caves are still worked intermittently to produce coloured ochres for use by artists as natural pigments. These are washed and milled for sale in the mine's ochre workshop. A range of ochre colours are available from the mine shop, from golden yellow to English Reds. Clearwell is also known as one of the few locations where rare natural purple ochre, particularly caput mortuum is found.

Well lit chambers have been made easily accessible to visitors, with displays throughout. There is a small museum, shop and café. A network of much deeper workings can be visited in the presence of an experienced guide and with appropriate caving equipment for safety. The upper caves are open to the general visitor.

Recreational use 
Parts of the caves were originally opened to the public by Ray Wright (1930-2015) from 1968 and are now managed by his son Jonathan Wright, who is a Freeminer, still producing ochre from the workings. The caves have been used as a Santa's Grotto at Christmas time for many years, for easter egg hunts and in the summer barbecues, concerts and theatrical performances. One chamber is large enough to permit underground functions, including an annual Halloween Party hosting over 300 people. Parts of the Doctor Who episodes "The Christmas Invasion" (2005), "The Satan Pit" (2006) and "Time of Angels" / "Flesh and Stone" (2010) were filmed in the caves.

All the underground scenes of the BBC series "Merlin", were filmed in the Caves. The caves have also long been used for filming science fiction scenes, such as in Blake's 7. The caves featured  substantially in the children's series "The Changes", "The Jensen Code" and "Kidnapped" among many others. More recently the caves have been featured in episodes of Britannia, Cursed and His Dark Materials.

Reported paranormal activity 
Claims of paranormal phenomena at the caves have been made over the years. These include reported sightings reports of the sound of metal clanging in the distance and many reported sightings of an old miner and the sound of footsteps and pick axes working.

In popular culture 
The caves were used as the interior for the Sycorax spaceship in the Doctor Who Christmas special, The Christmas Invasion in 2005.

See also 
 Old Bow And Old Ham Mines

References

External links 

 www.clearwellcaves.com/
BBC archive film of Clearwell Caves from 1977

Caves of Gloucestershire
Museums in Gloucestershire
Mining museums in England
Forest of Dean
Iron mines in England
Mines in Gloucestershire